The Rajiv Gandhi National Institute of Youth Development (RGNIYD), Sriperumbudur, Tamil Nadu, is an Institution of National Importance by the Act of Parliament No. 35/2012 under the Ministry of Youth Affairs & Sports, Government of India. The RGNIYD was set up in 1993 under the Societies Registration Act, XXVII of 1975.

The RGNIYD offers academic programs at the postgraduate level in youth development, engages in research in youth development, and coordinates training programs for state agencies and the officials of youth organizations. It is involved in extension and outreach initiatives across the country. The institute functions as a think-tank of the Ministry and an organization of youth-related activities. It works in cooperation within the NSS, NYKS and other youth organizations in the implementation of training programs.

This institute also offers Post Graduate Degree programs in the field of Gender Studies, Development Studies, Local Governance, Counselling Psychology, Social Innovation and Entrepreneurship and Social Work. It also offers a PhD in various disciplines of Social Sciences.

RGNIYD is a first of its kind of institute based on the youth development with the vision to enhance the potential of youth in the country. RGNIYD is a first such institute in South Asia to focus on youth issues, youth development prospects. The institute also gave India's first of its kind "India Youth Development Index", which was completely prepared by the RGNIYD.

External links 
 Official website

References

Educational institutions established in 1993
Colleges in Tamil Nadu
Ministry of Youth Affairs and Sports
1993 establishments in Tamil Nadu